Coleophora brunneosignata is a moth of the family Coleophoridae. It is found in France, on the island of Sardinia, and the Iberian Peninsula. It has also been seen in Morocco.

References

brunneosignata
Moths described in 1944
Moths of Europe
Moths of Africa